Rédha Bensayah (born 22 August 1994) is an Algerian footballer who plays as a winger for Saudi Arabian club Al-Jabalain.

Club career
On 13 June 2019, Bensayah signed his first professional contract with JS Kabylie. Bensayah made his professional debut with JS Kabylie in a 0-0 Algerian Ligue Professionnelle 1 tie with NA Hussein Dey on 15 August 2019.

On 21 June 2022, Bensayah joined Saudi Arabian side Al-Jabalain.

References

External links
 
 
 

1994 births
Living people
People from Bouïra
Algerian footballers
Algeria international footballers
Algerian expatriate footballers
JS Kabylie players
JSM Béjaïa players
Al-Jabalain FC players
Algerian Ligue Professionnelle 1 players
Algerian Ligue 2 players
Saudi First Division League players
Association football wingers
21st-century Algerian people
Expatriate footballers in Saudi Arabia
Algerian expatriate sportspeople in Saudi Arabia